Pîrlița is a commune in Soroca District, Moldova. It is composed of three villages: Pîrlița, Vanțina and Vanțina Mică.

References

Communes of Soroca District